Trevor Philp (born May 1, 1992) is a Canadian World Cup alpine ski racer specializing in the technical events of slalom and giant slalom. Philp has represented Canada at three Winter Olympics and five World Championships; born in Toronto, he resides in Calgary, Alberta.

In January 2022, Philp was named to Canada's 2022 Olympic team.

World Cup results

Season standings

Top twenty results
 0 podiums
 4 top tens

World Championship results

Olympic results

References

External links

 
 
 
 Alpine Canada.org – national ski team – athletes – Trevor Philp

1992 births
Living people
Canadian male alpine skiers
Skiers from Toronto
Alpine skiers at the 2014 Winter Olympics
Alpine skiers at the 2018 Winter Olympics
Alpine skiers at the 2022 Winter Olympics
Olympic alpine skiers of Canada